The US 190 Bridge at the Colorado River, near Lometa, Texas, brings U.S. Route 190 across the Colorado River between Lampasas County, Texas and San Saba County, Texas.  It was built in 1939-40 and was listed on the National Register of Historic Places in 1996.

It is a continuous through truss bridge, built to replace a Pennsylvania truss bridge called the Red Bluff
Bridge which was damaged by a flood in July 1938.

It was designed by the Texas Highway Department, fabricated by the Virginia Bridge Company, and built by Cage Brothers & L.A. Turner.

References

External links

Bridges in Texas
National Register of Historic Places in Lampasas County, Texas
National Register of Historic Places in San Saba County, Texas
Infrastructure completed in 1939
Bridges of the United States Numbered Highway System